Abdelkader Zrouri (born September 20, 1976) is a Moroccan Taekwondo athlete.

Zrouri competed in the men's +80 kg class at the 2008 Summer Olympics held in Beijing, China. In the preliminary round, he landed an axe kick (naeryeo chagi) on Juan Diaz of Venezuela and knocked Diaz out at 1:40 of the second round. However, Zrouri was eliminated in the quarterfinals by losing to eventual silver medalist Alexandros Nikolaidis of Greece 5-4.

References
 Profile

1976 births
Living people
Moroccan male taekwondo practitioners
Taekwondo practitioners at the 2004 Summer Olympics
Taekwondo practitioners at the 2008 Summer Olympics
Olympic taekwondo practitioners of Morocco
World Taekwondo Championships medalists
20th-century Moroccan people
21st-century Moroccan people